Madlamark is a neighborhood (delområde) in the city of Stavanger which lies in the southwestern part of the large municipality of Stavanger in Rogaland county, Norway. It is located in the borough of Madla at the innermost part of the Hafrsfjorden. This area was historically part of the municipality of Madla until 1965. Madlamark Church is located in the centre of the neighborhood.

References

Boroughs and neighbourhoods of Stavanger